Harpalus zabroides is a species of ground beetle native to Europe, where it can be found throughout Central Europe and in such countries as Baltic states (except for Estonia), Benelux, Belarus, Italy, Spain, Ukraine, in all states of former Yugoslavia (except for Croatia and North Macedonia), and all parts of Russia (except north and northwest). It is also found in such Asian countries as Armenia, Georgia, Iran, Kazakhstan, Kyrgyzstan, Tajikistan, and Turkey.

References

zabroides
Beetles of Asia
Beetles of Europe
Beetles described in 1829